Bill Schmitz (March 30, 1954 – August 26, 2013) was an American football coach. He served as head football coach at the United States Coast Guard Academy from 1993 to 1996 and Austin Peay State University from 1997 to 2002, compiling a career college football record of 39–65.

Coaching career
Schmitz served as the quarterbacks and receivers coach of the London Monarchs in the World League of American Football for the 1992 season.

Head coaching record

References

1954 births
2013 suicides
Austin Peay Governors football coaches
Cincinnati Bearcats football coaches
Coast Guard Bears football coaches
Columbia Lions football coaches
Eastern Michigan Eagles football coaches
London Monarchs coaches
Penn Quakers football coaches
Rice Owls football coaches
UAB Blazers football coaches
Vanderbilt Commodores football coaches
High school football coaches in Florida
Sportspeople from Cincinnati
Suicides by jumping in the United States
Suicides in Florida